There are multiple Lakeside Elementary Schools:

Lakeside Elementary School (Los Gatos, California) in Los Gatos, California.
Lakeside Elementary School (Pembroke Pines, Florida) of Broward County Public Schools in Pembroke Pines, Florida.
Lakeside Elementary School (Coppell, Texas) in Coppel Texas.